Harry Fereday Wright (12 October 1888–1950) was an English footballer who played in the Football League for Chesterfield, Newport County, West Bromwich Albion and Wolverhampton Wanderers. Whilst at West Brom, Wright played in the 1912 FA Cup Final where they lost 1–0 to Barnsley.

References

1888 births
1950 deaths
English footballers
Association football forwards
English Football League players
West Bromwich Albion F.C. players
Stourbridge F.C. players
Wolverhampton Wanderers F.C. players
Newport County A.F.C. players
Chesterfield F.C. players
FA Cup Final players